Herwig Rudolf Mitteregger (born September 6, 1953) is an Austrian musician. He became known with the Nina Hagen Band, where he played drums and percussions. He lives in Hamburg, Germany. He was also a member of German rock band Spliff. After two albums with Nina Hagen, he founded with his mates from the Nina Hagen Band – Bernhard Potschka (Guitar), Manfred Praeker (Bass), Reinhold Heil (Keyboards) – Spliff. After four records the band split up. Mitteregger released five solo albums until he moved to Spain and became a father. 2008 he returned to Germany and released Insolito.



Discography

Solo

Albums

Kein Mut. Kein Mädchen (1983)
Immer Mehr (1985)
Jedesmal (1987)
Mitteregger (1989)
Wie Im Leben (1992)
Aus Der Stille (1997)
Insolito (2008)
Fandango (2009)

With Spliff

Albums

The Spliff Radio Show (1980)
85555 (1982)
Herzlichen Glückwunsch (1982)
Schwarz auf Weiss (1984)

With the Nina Hagen Band

Albums

Nina Hagen Band (1978)
unbehagen (1979)

References

External links 
 Fan Ticker information

Living people
Austrian male musicians
1953 births